Sayed Haider Raza (22 February 1922 – 23 July 2016) was an Indian painter who lived and worked in France from 1950 until his death, while maintaining strong ties with India. He was born in Kakkaiya (District Mandla), Central Provinces, British India, which is now present-day Madhya Pradesh.

He was a renowned Indian artist. He was awarded the Padma Shri in 1981, Fellowship of the Lalit Kala Academi in 1984, Padma Bhushan in 2007, and Padma Vibhushan in 2013. He was conferred with the Commandeur de la Legion d'honneur (Legion of Honour) on 14 July 2015.

His seminal work Saurashtra sold for 16.42 crore ($3,486,965) at a Christie's auction in 2010.

In 1959 he married the French artist Janine Mongillat, who died of cancer in 2002. In 2010 he decided to return to India.

Early life and education 

Sayed Haider Raza was born in Kakkaiya, near theeBiography]  shraza.net, the Official website.</ref> Mandla district, Madhya Pradesh, to Sayed Mohammed Razi, the Deputy Forest Ranger of the district and Tahira Begum. It was here where he spent his early years, completed primary education, and took to drawing at the age of 12. He moved to Damoh (also in Madhya Pradesh) at 13; where he completed his high school education from Government High School, Damoh.

After high school, he studied further at the Nagpur School of Art, Nagpur (1939–43), followed by Sir J. J. School of Art, Mumbai (1943–47), before moving to France in October 1950 to study at the École Nationale supérieure des Beaux-Arts (ENSB-A), Paris (1950-1953) on a Government of France scholarship. After his studies, he traveled across Europe, and continued to live and exhibit his work in Paris. He was later awarded the Prix de la critique in Paris in 1956, becoming the first non-French artist to receive the honor.

Art career

Early career 

Sayed Haider Raza, had his first solo show when he was 24 in 1946 at Bombay Art Society Salon, and was awarded the Silver Medal of the society.

His work evolved from painting expressionistic landscapes to abstract ones. From his fluent water colours of landscapes and townscapes executed in the early 1940s, he moved toward a more expressive language, painting landscapes of the mind.

Raza carefully crafted his career to become an inspiration to two generations of artists. The year of 1947 proved to be a very important year for him. First, his mother died. Then, he co-founded the revolutionary Bombay Progressive Artists' Group (PAG) (1947–1956) along with K. H. Ara and F. N. Souza. This group set out to break free from the influences of European realism in Indian art and bring Indian inner vision (Antar gyan) into the art,. The group had its first show in 1948. A revolutionary amount of art was created by the people in this group from 1940 to 1990. Raza's father died the same year his mother had died in Mandla. The majority of his four brothers and sister, migrated to Pakistan, after the partition of India. In the early years, the group continued its close rapport. Krishen Khanna speaks of the first exhibition Raza, Akbar Padamsee and F. N. Souza mounted together at the Gallery Cruz in Paris. "Souza and Padamsee painted in a quasi-modern fashion. Raza, however, made a throwback to the Mughal period, creating jewel-like water colours, with the pigment rubbed in with a shell. He was vastly successful and acquired by important collectors."

Once in France, he continued to experiment with currents of Western Modernism, moving from Expressionist modes towards greater abstraction and eventually incorporating elements of Tantrism from Indian scriptures. Whereas his fellow contemporaries dealt with more figural subjects, Raza chose to focus on landscapes in the 1940s and 50s, inspired in part by a move to France. In 1956, he was awarded the prestigious Prix de la Critique, this was a monumental award to the art scene in India.

In 1962, he became a visiting lecturer at the University of California in Berkeley, USA. Raza was initially enamored of the bucolic countryside of rural France. Eglise is part of a series which captures the rolling terrain and quaint village architecture of this region. Showing a tumultuous church engulfed by an inky blue night sky, Raza uses gestural brushstrokes and a heavily impasto-ed application of paint, stylistic devices which hint at his later 1970s abstractions.

The "Bindu" and beyond 

By the 1970s Raza had grown increasingly unhappy and restless with his own work and wanted to find a new direction and deeper authenticity in his work, and move away from what he called the 'plastic art'. His trips to India, especially to caves of Ajanta - Ellora, followed by those to Varanasi, Gujarat and Rajasthan, made him realize his role and study Indian culture more closely, the result was "Bindu", which signified his rebirth as a painter.  The Bindu came forth in 1980, and took his work deeper and brought in, his new-found Indian vision and Indian ethnography.  One of the reasons he attributes to the origin of the "Bindu", have been his elementary school teacher, who on finding him lacking adequate concentration, drew a dot on the blackboard and asked him to concentrate on it. The "Bindu" is related to Indian philosophy of being the point of all creation. The reason this interested Raza so much is because he was looking for new inspiration for his art and this created a new point of creation for himself.

After the introduction of "BUNDU" (a point or the source of energy), he added newer dimensions to his thematic oeuvre in the following decades, with the inclusion of themes around the Tribhuj (Triangle), which bolstered Indian concepts of space and time, as well as that of "prakriti-purusha" (the cosmic substance and the energy or the spirit respectively), his transformation from an expressionist to a master of abstraction and profundity, was complete. His multiple works of art with the bindu is what truly tied him to his Indian roots and culture. This art created a sense of pride for his culture. The bindu is now widely regarded as a trademark for Raza and he said in 2010 that "It's the centre of my life".

Raza abandoned the expressionistic landscape for a geometric abstraction and the "Bindu". Raza perceived the Bindu as the center of creation and existence progressing towards forms and color as well as energy, sound, space and time.

His work took another leap in 2000, when he began to express his increasingly deepened insights and thoughts on Indian spiritual, and created works around the Kundalini, Nagas, and the Mahabharat.

Public contributions 
For the promotion of art among Indian youth, he established the Raza Foundation in India which gives the Annual Raza Foundation Award to young artists in India.
The Raza Foundation in France, based in the artist village of Gorbio, runs the Estate of Sayed Haider Raza.

Later years and death 
In 2011, a few years after the death of his wife, S.H. Raza decided to move back from France to New Delhi, where he continued to work several hours a day up until his death on 22 July 2016, at the age of 94, in New Delhi. His last wish being laid to rest in his hometown Mandla beside his father's grave was fulfilled. He was buried in Mandla city's kabristan.

Awards 
 1946: Silver Medal, Bombay Art Society, Mumbai
 1948: Gold Medal, Bombay Art Society, Mumbai
 1956: Prix de la critique, Paris
 1981: Padma Shri; the Government of India
 1984: Fellowship of the Lalit Kala Akademi, New Delhi
 1992–1993: Kalidas Samman, Government of Madhya Pradesh
 2004: Lalit Kala Ratna Puraskar, Lalit Kala Academy, New Delhi
 2007: Padma Bhushan; the Government of India
 2013: Padma Vibhushan; the Government of India
 2013: one of the greatest living global Indian legends ... NDTV INDIA
 2014: D. Litt (Honoris Causa), Indira Kala Sangit Vishwavidyalaya, Khairagarh, Chhattisgarh
 2015: Commandeur de la Légion d’Honneur (the Legion of Honour); Republic of France
 2015: D. Litt (Honoris Causa), Shiv Nadar University, Greater Noida, Uttar Pradesh

Solo exhibitions 
 2016; Nirantar, Delhi, Mumbai and Kolkata
 2015: Galerie Lara Vincy, Paris, "Raza: Paintings"
 2015: Akar Prakar, Kolkata, "Aarambh – Raza at 93"
 2015: Art Musings, Mumbai, "Aarambh @ 93: Solo Show of SH Raza"
 2014: Grosvenor Vadehra, London, "SH Raza – Pyaas"
 2014: Sovereign FZE, Dubai, "Raza: Paysage, Select Works 1950s – 1970s"
 2014: Vadehra Art Gallery, New Delhi, "SH Raza - Parikrama – Around Gandhi"
 2013: Akar Prakar, Kolkata, "Shabd- bindu – A show of recent works by SH Raza & poetry by Ashok Vajpeyi"
 2013: Vadehra Art Gallery, New Delhi, "Antardhwani"
 2012: ICIA, The Art Trust, Mumbai, "SH Raza – Solo Show"
 2012: Art Musings, Mumbai, "SH Raza: Vistaar"
 2012: Grosvenor Gallery, London, "Bindu Vistaar"
 2011: Vadehra Art Gallery & Lalit Kala Akademi, New Delhi, "SH Raza, Punaraagman"
 2010: Flora Jansem Gallery, Raza Ceramiques, Paris
 2010: Galerie Patrice Trigano, Paris, "Sayed Haider Raza, Œuvres 1950-2001"
 2010: Akar Prakar Art Gallery, Kolkata, Ahmadabad, Jaipur, Delhi, INDIA in 2010
 2010: Vadehra Art Gallery, New Delhi, "Recent Works – SH Raza"
 2008: Art Alive Art Gallery, Delhi, India in 2008
 Exhibition Magnificent Seven at Art Alive Gallery
 2007: Ayran Art Gallery, Mumbai, New Delhi, Hong Kong, "SH Raza - Celebrating 85 Years of living Legend"
 2007: RL Fine ARTS, New York, "SH Raza: Master of Colors – Selected Works"
 2007: The Arts Trust at the ICIA, Mumbai, "SH Raza- Solo Show"
 2007: National Gallery of Modern Art, New Delhi, "Swati – S.H. Raza"
 2006: TAO Art Gallery, Mumbai, "Rang Ras – S.H. Raza"
 2006: RL Fine Arts, New York, SH Raza: Selected Works
 2006: Vadehra Art Gallery, New Delhi, "Raza"
 2006: Hong Kong, Aryan Art Gallery, "Raza: Metamorphosis"
 2005: Aryan Art Gallery, New Delhi, "Raza – Recent Works"
 2005: Saffronart & Berkeley Square Gallery, London & New York, "SH Raza: Summer 2005"
 2004: Art Musings, Mumbai, "SH Raza"
 2003: Berlin, The Fine Art Resource, "SH Raza: Paintings from 1996 to 2003"
 2001: Delhi Art Gallery, New Delhi, "Mindscapes: The Sacred Search: a select collection of works from 1951- 2002 by Raza"
 1999: Gallery 54, New York, "Raza"
 1997: Roopankar Museum of Fine Arts, Bharat Bhavan, Bhopal
 1997: Jehangir Art Gallery Mumbai
 1997: National Gallery of Modern Art, New Delhi.
 1997: Vadhera Art Gallery & Chemould Gallery, Bhopal, Mumbai & New Delhi, "Raza: Avartan 1991-1996"
 1994: The Art Rental Corporate, Group Michael Ferrier, Échirolles, Grenoble
 1992: Jehangir Nicholson Museum, National Centre for Performing Arts, Mumbai
 1992: Courses Arts Lalouvesc, France
 1991: Gallery Eterso, Cannes, "Bindu ou la quête de l'essentiel", 28 June – 17 August
 1991: Palais de Carnolès, Musée des Beaux-Arts, Menton, "Raza: Rétrospective 1952-1991"
 1991: Chemould Gallery, Bombay, "Raza Anthology 1980-1990"
 1988: Chemould Gallery, Bombay; Koloritten Galleri, Stavanger, Norway
 1987: The Head of the artist, Grenoble
 1985: Galerie Pierre Parat, Paris
 1984: Chemould Gallery, Bombay
 1982: Gallery Loeb, Bern, Switzerland; Gallery JY Noblet, Grenoble
 1980: Galleriet, Oslo
 1976: Mumbai, Gallery Chemould at the Jehangir Art Gallery, Raza, 26 February – 1 March 1976.
 1975: Sanremo, Galleria Matuzia, Raza, 4 – 31 October 1975.
 1969: Paris, Galerie Lara Vincy, Raza: Peintures Recentes, 27 November 1969 – 5 January 1970.
 1968: Bombay, Gallery Chemould, Raza, 15 – 27 April 1968.
 1968: Toronto, Gallery Dresdnere, Raza – Recent Oil Paintings, 25 October – 9 November 1968.
 1968: Cologne, Dom Galerie, Sayed Haider Raza, 26 March – 4 May 1968.
 1967: Paris, Galerie Lara Vincy, 1967.
 1966: Düsseldorf, Tecta Galerie, Raza – Paris: 25 Oil Paintings from 1962- 1966, 6 October – 10 November 1966.
 1963 Cologne, Dom Galerie, Raza, June – July 1963.
 1964: Paris, Galerie Lara Vincy, Raza: Peintures récentes, 18 November 1964 – 10 January 1965.
 1962: Galerie Dresdnere, Montreal
 1962:  Galerie Lara Vincy, Paris, Raza, 15 July 1962.
 1961: Paris, Galerie Lara Vincy, Raza, 19 April- 18 May 1961.
 1960: Montreal, Galerie Dresdnere, Autumn 1960.
 1959: Montreal, Galerie Dresdnere, Raza: Peintures et Gouaches, 5th – 19th MAY 1959.
 1958: Galerie Lara Vincy, Paris, "Raza - Prix de la Critique 1956. Peintures et gouaches" (April–May)
 1956: Galerie Saint-Placide, Paris, "Raza"
 1950: Charles Petrat's Institute of foreign Languages, Mumbai (September)
 1950: The IFL International Centre, Bombay, "SH Raza: Farewell Exhibition of Paintings" (September)
 1948: Exhibition Hall, New Delhi, "Raza: 100 paintings of Kashmir", organised by Rudolf Von Leyden, (September)
 1947: Bombay Art Society, "Raza's Watercolour Landscapes", (November)
 1946: First solo exhibition at the Bombay Art Society Salon

Selected Biennales 
 1956: Venice Biennale, Italy.
 1957: Biennale 57, Pavillon de Marsan, Paris, France.
 1958: Bienal de São Paulo, Brazil.
 1958: Biennale, Brussels, Belgium.
 1958: Biennale of Young Contemporary Painters, Bruges, Belgium.
 1958: Venice Biennale, Italy.
 1961: Biennale of Tokyo, Japan.
 1962: Salon Comparaisons, Paris, France.
 1963: Biennale du Maroc, Rabat, Morocco.
 1964: Biennale de Menton, France.
 1966: Biennale de Menton, France.
 1966: Salon Comparaisons, Paris.
 1968: Biennale de Menton, France.
 1972: Biennale de Menton, France.
 1976: Biennale de Menton, France.
 1978: Biennale de Menton, France.
 1986: Bienal de la Habana, Havana, Cuba

Further reading 
 S.H Raza, by Soufiane Bensabra, Les Éditions de la Différence, Paris, 2020
 "Yet Again: Nine New Essays on Raza", by Ashok Vajpeyi, Mapin Publishing Pvt, Ahmedabad, India, 2015.
 "SH Raza: The Journey of a Master", published by Vadehra Art Gallery, New Delhi, 2014.
 "Understanding Raza: Many Ways of Looking at a Master", Ashok Vajpeyi (ed.), Vadehra Art Gallery, New Delhi, 2013.
 "My Dear: Letters Between Sayed Haider Raza & Krishen Khanna", Ashok Vajpeyi, The Raza Correspondence, Vadehra Art Gallery, New Delhi, 2013.
 "SH Raza: Vistaar", by Ranjit Hoskote, Ashok Vajpeyi, Yashodhara Dalmia and Avni Doshi, Afterimage Publishing, Mumbai, 2012.
 "Mandalas", by Olivier Germain-Thomas, Art Alive Gallery, 2009 (originally published in French by Éditions Albin Michel, Paris, 2004)
 Raza by Alain Bonfand, Les Éditions de la Différence, Paris, 2008. (French and English Edition. Lithographs Estampes - Éditions de La Différence edited by Éditions de la Différence, Paris)
 A Life in Art: S.H. Raza, by Ashok Vajpeyi, Art Alive Masters Series Books, New Delhi, 2007
 Raza: A Life in Art, by Ashok Vajpeyi, 2007, Art Alive Gallery, New Delhi. .
 Passion....Life and Art of Raza, by Sayed Haider Raza, Ashok Vajpeyi (Ed.). 2005, Rajkamal Books. .
 "Atma Ka Taap", by Rajkamal Prakashan, S.H. Raza et Ashok Vajpeyi, New Delhi, 2004.
 "Raza. An Introduction to his Painting", by Michel Imbert, Rainbow Publishers, Noida, 2003.
 "Raza: Text-Interview-Poetry, Ravi Kumar" by ashok Vajpeyi, New Delhi, 2002.
 Bindu: Space and time in Raza's vision, by Geeti Sen. Media Transasia, 1997. .
 Jacques Lassaigne, "Raza", in Cimaise, n°79, Paris, January–February–March 1967

References

External links 

The Raza Foundation
Documentary produced by NDTV
Interview with Sansad TV (in Hindi)

1922 births
2016 deaths
Indian male painters
Indian Muslims
Sir Jamsetjee Jeejebhoy School of Art alumni
Recipients of the Padma Shri in arts
Recipients of the Padma Bhushan in arts
Fellows of the Lalit Kala Akademi
People from Mandla
People from Damoh
École des Beaux-Arts alumni
Indian expatriates in France
Recipients of the Padma Vibhushan in arts
20th-century Indian painters
21st-century Indian painters
Indian watercolourists
Indian Expressionist painters
Painters from Madhya Pradesh
20th-century Indian male artists
21st-century Indian male artists